Pretty Balanced was an American band based in Columbus, Ohio, United States. Its unique sound is the result of a fusion of instruments often associated with chamber music, such as violin, cello, and piano, playing rock compositions, and often employing electronic production. Its members are Jude Shimer (also of The Sneaky Mister) on piano and cello, Forest Christenson (of Solarist, formerly The Liberty Tax, and Starving Goliath) on drums and violin, and Parker Ross (of El Jewbacabra) on bass.

History
The band formed in 2004, while the members were attending Fort Hayes Metropolitan Education Center. The original lineup included John Siddall on bass, but he was replaced by Ross after leaving Columbus for college.

In 2005, the Pretty Balanced song "Simon's Sleeping" was featured on Projekt Records' compilation A Dark Cabaret, which sold nationally in Hot Topic stores.

In 2006, the band won second place in the Columbus Dispatch Battle of the Bands 3, winning $300 and five hours of recording time at John Schwab Recording.

After the members graduated from high school in 2006, the band went on a partial-hiatus, but still played shows throughout the Eastern and Midwest United States, and performed in the UK in 2008 and 2009.

In early 2009 they changed their name to "The Alphabet" and, in 2010, Shimer announced the band's breakup on their blog.

Discography
Studio albums:
 Icicle Bicycle, 2006
 Conical Monocle, 2008
 Scarlet Starlet, 2009 (as The Alphabet)
Other releases:
 Free Public Consumption, 2005 (Demo)
 Re-mix-a Spektor, 2005 (EP)
 The Tape Dust, 2005 (EP)
 i.B. ReLease, 2006 (Live concert recording)

Appears on
 A Dark Cabaret, 2005

See also
 Amanda Palmer
 List of dark cabaret artists
 Regina Spektor
 Evelyn Evelyn

References

External links
 Pretty Balanced on Myspace
 Pretty Balanced on Last.fm
 Forest Christenson and Solarist website
 Official free Pretty Balanced music download page

Dark cabaret musicians
Electronic music groups from Ohio
Indie rock musical groups from Ohio
Musical groups from Columbus, Ohio